Ahmadabad-e Posht Kan (also Romanized as Aḩmadābād-e Posht Kan; also known as Aḩmadābād) is a village in Jowzam Rural District, Dehaj District, Shahr-e Babak County, Kerman Province, Iran. At the 2006 census, its population was 14, in 5 families.

References 

Populated places in Shahr-e Babak County